Alán Aspuru-Guzik is a professor of chemistry, computer science, chemical engineering and materials science at the University of Toronto. His research group studies machine learning, quantum computing and automated chemistry. He is the chief scientific officer and a co-founder of quantum computing startup Zapata Computing.

Early life
Aspuru-Guzik was raised in Mexico City, Mexico. When he was in junior high, he represented Mexico at the International Chemistry Olympiad after which his passion for science, particularly chemistry, grew.

Aspuru-Guzik had obtained his Bachelor of Science degree in chemistry from the National Autonomous University of Mexico in 1999. In 2004, he was awarded a Ph.D. in physical chemistry from the University of California, Berkeley. He continued at Berkeley as a postdoctoral fellow between 2005 and 2006, working with Martin Head-Gordon.

Career
From 2006 to 2010, Aspuru-Guzik was an assistant professor at Harvard University, before becoming associate professor in 2010, and professor in 2013. In 2018, Professor Aspuru-Guzik moved to the University of Toronto as a Canada 150 Research Chair.

From 2012 to 2014, Aspuru-Guzik had worked with Michael Aziz and Roy Gordon with funding from the United States Department of Energy to develop grid-scale, metal-free flow batteries. In 2016, Aspuru-Guzik had worked with Ryan Babbush, a quantum engineer at Google to develop a new algorithm for a quantum computer which will be able to detect various molecules, such as cholesterol. Generalizing such research efforts, he has substantially contributed to developing ideas of hybrid quantum classical algorithms.

Since 2018, he has given lectures at the Information Science and Technology Center, Colorado State University, Williams College, and the College of New Jersey.

Awards
2009 – Dow Foundation Distinguished Lecturer, University of California, Santa Barbara
2009 – Closs Lecturer, University of Chicago
2009 – Sloan Research Fellow
2010 – Hascoe Distinguished Lecturer, University of Connecticut
2010 – American Chemical Society Hewlett-Packard Outstanding Junior Faculty Award
2010 – MIT Technology Review Young Innovator Under 35 (TR35)
2011 – Big Think Delphi Fellow
2012 – Ulam Fellow, Los Alamos National Laboratories
2012 – Phillips Distinguished Visitor, Haverford College
2012 – Elected Fellow, American Physical Society
2013 – ACS Early Career Award in Theoretical Chemistry
2013 – Computer World Data+ Award
2015 – Information Science and Technology Center Distinguished Lecturer, Colorado State University
2015 – Canadian Institute for Advanced Research (CIFAR) Senior Fellow
2016 – Per-Olov Löwdin Lecturer, Uppsala University
2017 – Elected Fellow of the American Association for the Advancement of Science (AAAS)
2017–2018; Invited Member of the World Economic Forum's Global Future Council on Advanced Materials
2018 – Canada 150 Research Chair in Theoretical and Quantum Chemistry
2018 – The Phi Beta Kappa Society Visiting Scholar
2019 – Canada CIFAR AI Chair, Vector Institute
2019 – Senior Fellow, Massey College
2019 – Laird Lecture, Memorial University of Newfoundland

References

External links

Research group website

1976 births
Living people
National Autonomous University of Mexico alumni
UC Berkeley College of Chemistry alumni
Harvard University faculty
Academic staff of the University of Toronto
Fellows of the American Physical Society
People from Mexico City